Rocksmith+ is a subscription-based music education service from Ubisoft focused on learning guitar and bass. It was released September 6, 2022 on PC and follows Rocksmith 2014.

History 
Ubisoft announced the Rocksmith+ subscription service at Ubisoft Forward during E3 2021. Rocksmith+ was initially set to launch in Fall 2021 for the PlayStation 4, PlayStation 5, Xbox One, Xbox Series X/S, and PC, and on Android and iOS at a later date.

A Rocksmith+ PC closed beta ran in July 2021. Beta reviews were generally positive while noting a desire for more songs and improved features, and cautious optimism waiting to see what the final product will be and how the song library would expand over time. The beta library had roughly 500 songs, with the expectation of increasing to thousands at launch. Ubisoft says that “millions more” songs will be added in the future. In September 2021, Ubisoft announced that the Rocksmith+ release date would be delayed until 2022, to make changes based on beta user feedback. It released on September 6, 2022.

Overview 
Rocksmith+ is a follow-up to the original Rocksmith franchise, with a major change to a subscription-based music education service. Using their own instruments, users play along to songs in the Rocksmith+ library, with genres including rock, pop, hip hop, country, Latin and R&B. Players can connect an acoustic, electric, or bass guitar via a special USB jack (called the Rocksmith Real Tone cable), audio interface, or via a smartphone’s microphone with the use of the free Rocksmith+ Connect mobile app. Players can also use Rocksmith Workshop to create and add their own guitar arrangements.

References

External links 

 

2022 video games
Ubisoft games
Subscription services
Music video games
Video games developed in the United States
Windows games